The Foss Dyke, or Fossdyke, connects the River Trent at Torksey to Lincoln, the county town of Lincolnshire, and may be the oldest canal in England that is still in use. It is usually thought to have been built around AD 120 by the Romans, but there is no consensus among authors. It was refurbished in 1121, during the reign of King Henry I, and responsibility for its maintenance was transferred to the city of Lincoln by King James I. Improvements made in 1671 included a navigable sluice or lock at Torksey, and warehousing and wharves were built at Brayford Pool in the centre of Lincoln.

Connection to the River Witham at Brayford was hampered by the small bore and depth of High Bridge, a medieval structure just below the pool. The channel through it was made deeper in 1795, but John Rennie's plans to demolish it in 1803 were not adopted. The canal was leased to several generations of the Ellison family, who profited from the tolls but failed to maintain it. Although cargoes of coal and wool moved to the railway, the carriage of grain continued, and the last commercial operation was in 1972. The Brayford Mere Trust have turned Brayford Pool into a marina, and the Lincolnshire Waterways Partnership are opening a footpath and cycleway from Lincoln to Torksey; the section to Saxilby was officially opened on 26 July 2011.

Route
The Foss Dyke joins the River Trent at Torksey. A branch leaves the main channel, passes under the A156 bridge, and immediately enters Torksey lock, which is the only lock on the canal. It has six sets of gates, three sets facing Lincoln, and three facing the river, which is tidal at this point, and so its level can be higher than the level of the canal. The gates allow the lock to be used at most states of the tide. A steel footbridge crosses the lock near the road, and both the footbridge and the lock are grade II listed structures. The canal runs to the east, and then turns south, passing to the east of Fenton and Kettlethorpe. Soon it is joined by the A57, and turns east again. The road runs along the south bank, until Saxilby is reached.

At Saxilby, the Manchester, Sheffield and Lincolnshire Railway crosses the waterway, to run along the south bank all the way to Lincoln. There was once a swing bridge beyond the railway bridge, which was removed in 1937, although the foundations are still obvious. Access over the canal at this point was reinstated in 1987, when a footbridge was installed. The original bridge was manufactured in 1884, and crossed the Great Northern Railway at Newark-on-Trent for 103 years before it was put to a new use. The A57 crosses to the north bank soon after the railway bridge. The River Till flows south and under the road to join the Foss Dyke, after which a new marina has been built at Burton Meadows. Because the construction has breached the flood bank, it is protected by a flood gate. The canal crosses under the A46 on the outskirts of Lincoln, and then over a drainage ditch, to run alongside the Carholme golf club. The final bridge carries the B1273 Brayford Way over the canal as it enters Brayford Pool, once a busy commercial wharf in the centre of Lincoln, but now a marina with the University of Lincoln on the southern bank. The unnavigable River Witham flows into the bottom end of the pool, and becomes the Witham Navigation when it flows out on its way to Boston.

History
The Foss Dyke was long thought to have been constructed by the Romans around 120. Pointers include an inscribed statuette of the god Mars found in it at Torksey, which is now in the British Museum, but there is a lack of consensus among authors writing on the subject.

The first record of it comes from Symeon of Durham, whose Historia Regium notes the following for the year 1121:

Some take this to mean that the canal did not exist before Henry's construction work. Thus Kevin Leahy writes:

Others, though, consider that Henry I merely scoured out an existing structure; Mark Bennett, writing for the East Midlands Archaeological Research Framework says:

It possibly follows an earlier line of the Trent, which emptied into the Wash prior to the end of the last Ice Age. Together with the  Car Dyke it formed part an important transport route from Peterborough to York.

It was reputedly used by the Danes when they invaded England and by the Normans to carry stone to build Lincoln Cathedral in the 11th century. Following King Henry I's work discussed above, the canal deteriorated, until by the 17th century it was virtually impassable.  Katherine Swynford, who lived in the area, is credited with having organized a protest to repair it, in 1375. King James I transferred ownership to the Corporation of Lincoln.

In 1671, during the reign of Charles II, Lincoln obtained an Act which authorised improvements from Boston to the Trent. Work was carried out on the Foss Dyke, but only the first  of the Witham, from Brayford Pool to High Bridge, received attention. The work was carried out by Samuel Fortrey, a man with previous experience of draining the fens. He was required to bear some of the cost himself, in exchange for some of the profits. The work was completed in 1672, and included a navigable sluice or lock at Torksey, which had first been proposed by Simon Hill in 1632. Warehouses and wharves were built at Brayford Pool, but by 1717, passage from Torksey was again difficult. The city of Lincoln did not have the expertise to manage the waterway, and so leased it to Richard Ellison in 1741, who had experience with the River Don Navigation. He paid £75 per year for a navigation which generated around £100 in toll receipts. He dredged it to provide  of depth, and re-opened it in 1744. Two years later, the tolls were £595, and continued to increase. Under his son, the tolls were £2,367 in 1789, while his grandson collected £5,159 in 1811.

Navigation through Lincoln and on to Boston was hampered by the shallow draught available under the medieval High Bridge, just below Brayford Pool. Sir Joseph Banks, when proposing the construction of the Horncastle Canal knew that the problem needed addressing, and William Jessop was commissioned to survey the Witham and the Foss Dyke in 1791, with particular reference to the junction between the two. He proposed a bypass to the south of the city, using the Sincil Dyke, or excavating the channel beneath the bridge, although he recognized that this solution was not ideal, due to the narrow width of the bridge hole, and the lack of a towing path through it. However, the city was keen to keep trade within its limits, and improvements to High Bridge, which were completed by 1795, were authorised as part of the Horncastle Canal act of 1792.

The Witham Navigation was soon needing repairs, and the commissioners asked John Rennie for advice in 1802. Neither action was followed. The canal was difficult to maintain, because much of it ran through sand and quicksand. The situation was more complex, because it had been leased to the Ellisons for three generations, and Richard Ellison III was not keen to spend any money on it. Income from tolls would have more than covered repairs, but there was little that could be done. A challenge to the legality of his lease was considered in the 1820s, but was not thought likely to succeed. He died in 1827, and Humphrey Sibthorp, his niece's husband, who was a proprietor on the River Witham, took over responsibility for it. He asked Isambard Brunel to survey it, and although he did so in 1833, no improvements were made.

Railways arrived in Lincoln in 1848. The Wakefield, Lincoln and Boston Railway had negotiated with the proprietors of the Witham and Foss Dyke in 1846, to guarantee them an income by leasing the waterways. Richard Ellison IV had agreed a lease for 894 years, at £9,570 per year, based on the average profit for the previous three years plus 5 per cent. The line was built by the Great Northern Railway (GNR), who took over the leases already agreed. The Witham was affected more than the Foss Dyke, as the line followed its bank from Lincoln to Boston. The Manchester, Sheffield and Lincolnshire Railway (MSLR) passed through Saxilby to Lincoln a little later. Combined figures for the two waterways showed a drop in goods carried of two-thirds between 1848 and 1868. Cargoes of coal and wool were the first to transfer to the railways. However, the MSLR, by then renamed the Great Central Railway (GCR), built a dock and transshipment warehouse at Brayford in 1897. A series of takeovers and mergers resulted in its ownership changing several times, before it was nationalised, and became the responsibility of the British Waterways Board in 1948.

Although its date of construction is unknown, the London and North Eastern Railway (successors of both the GNR and the GCR) built a small pumping station to the west of Torksey lock. It contained a steam-powered beam engine, which was probably made by Davy Brothers of Sheffield, and drove a double-acting bucket pump. Its job was to maintain the water levels in the navigation, but it was demolished in 1936, and no traces of it remain. A new pumping station at a similar location was commissioned in 1974. This forms part of the Trent–Witham–Ancholme transfer scheme. A pumping station at Short Ferry on Barlings Eau pumps water through an  pipeline to Toft Newton reservoir, on the upper reaches of the Ancholme. The water is used to maintain the flow and level of the Ancholme during the summer months and other dry periods. When there is insufficient water in Barlings Eau and the Witham, Torksey pumping station transfers water from the Trent through a short pipeline into Foss Dyke. From there it flows for  along the waterway to Brayford Pool and so into the Witham, to supplement the water available for pumping.

Restoration
Unlike many waterways, the Foss Dyke never closed, and continued to carry grain traffic until 1972. However, the demise of general commercial traffic had left Brayford Pool in the centre of Lincoln as a derelict body of water, full of debris such as rubbish and sunken boats. The local Chamber of Commerce sought to address the issue in 1965, and formed Brayford Improvement Committee. Advice was sought from the Inland Waterways Association, and eventually the Brayford Mere Trust was constituted. They removed the wrecks from the pool, and have rebuilt the site, so that it offers facilities for visiting pleasure craft, now the major users of the waterway. A former lift bridge, which crossed the western entrance to the pool, was replaced in August 1996 by a new concrete flyover, as part of the redevelopment of the south bank, which included the opening of the University in the same year.  to the west of Lincoln, a new  marina has been constructed at Burton Waters, as part of a  housing development.

Construction of a footpath and cycleway beside the canal from Lincoln to Saxilby has been carried out by the Lincolnshire Waterways Partnership, a joint initiative by Lincolnshire County Council, the Environment Agency and British Waterways. For much of its route it runs along the top of the northern floodbank, but drops down to a new crossing of the A57 road and a new bridge across the River Till near Saxilby. The route was officially opened on 26 July 2011. Extending the path to Torksey is a longer term aim.

Points of interest

See also

Canals of the United Kingdom
History of the British canal system
List of Roman canals
Upper Witham IDB

Bibliography

References

External links

Buildings and structures completed in the 2nd century
Roman canals
Canals in England
Buildings and structures in Lincoln, England
Roman sites in England
Canals in Lincolnshire
Canals linked to the River Trent
Tourist attractions in Lincolnshire
Archaeological sites in Lincolnshire
Ancient dikes